Malekayad (also Romanized as Malekāyād; also known as Malekābād) is a village in Pachehlak-e Sharqi Rural District, in the Central District of Aligudarz County, Lorestan Province, Iran. At the 2006 census, its population was 216, in 40 families.

References 

Towns and villages in Aligudarz County